Thacker may refer to:

People
Thacker is an occupational surname, originally denoting a “thatcher”.

Notable people with this surname include:

Angela Thacker (born 1964), American long jumper
Blaine Thacker (1941–2020), Member of Canadian Parliament
Brian Thacker (born 1945), American army officer; recipient of the Medal of Honor for action during the Vietnam war
Cathy Gillen Thacker (contemporary), American author of romance novels
Charles M. Thacker (1866–1918), Justice of the Oklahoma Supreme Court
Charles P. Thacker (1943–2017), American computer pioneer
David Thacker (born 1950), English award-winning theatre director
D. D. Thacker (1884–1961), Indian coal miner and philanthropist
Edwin Thacker (1913–1974), South African athlete
Eugene Thacker, American philosopher
Frank Thacker (1876–1949), English footballer
Gail Thacker (contemporary), avant-garde photographer and theater manager
Harry Thacker, (born 1994), English rugby union footballer
Henry Thacker (1870–1939), New Zealand physician and politician; member of Parliament 1914–22
Herbert Cyril Thacker (1870–1953), Canadian army general; Chief of the General Staff 1927–29
Jeremy Thacker, 18th-century writer and watchmaker
Julie Thacker (contemporary), American television writer
Lawrence Thacker, rugby league footballer of the 1930s and 1940s for England, and Hull
Mary Rose Thacker (1922–1983), former Canadian singles figure skater
Moe Thacker (1934–1997), American professional baseball player
Paul D. Thacker (contemporary), American journalist in medical topics
Ralph Thacker (1880–after 1915), American college football coach
Ransley Thacker 1891–1965), British lawyer and judge
Robert E. Thacker (1918–2020), American test pilot and model aircraft enthusiast
Stephanie Thacker (born 1965), United States Circuit Judge
Tab Thacker (1962–2007), American collegiate wrestler and actor
Thomas Thacker (died 1548), steward of Thomas Cromwell, Repton Priory
Tom Thacker (basketball) (born 1939), American professional basketball player
Tom Thacker (musician) (born 1974) Canadian singer and lead guitarist

Places
Thacker, West Virginia, U.S.
Thacker Creek

Other uses
Thacker Shield, a rugby league football trophy
 Kevin Thacker, a fictional character in the 2008 film The Coverup, previously known as The Thacker Case
William Thacker, a fictional character in the 1999 film Notting Hill
 Thackers, a fictional farm in the novel "A Traveller in Time” by Alison Uttley

See also

Thatcher (disambiguation)

Occupational surnames
English-language occupational surnames